Keith Braithwaite is a former association football player who represented New Zealand at international level.

Braithwaite played for Christchurch United Football Club from 1982 - 1992. During his time with the club, Braithwaite became their all time longest serving captain, as well as the club's top goal scorer. In 1987, he set a National League record of scoring six goals in a single game against Manawatu.

Braithwaite made a solitary official international appearance for New Zealand in a 3–2 win over Saudi Arabia on 23 June 1988.

References

External links
 
 

Year of birth missing (living people)
Living people
New Zealand association footballers
New Zealand international footballers
Association football midfielders
Christchurch United players
New Zealand association football coaches